Splendour in the Grass (commonly referred to as Splendour) is an annual Australian music festival held at the North Byron Parklands in Yelgun, New South Wales. Since its inauguration, the festival has also been held in various locations near Byron Bay, New South Wales, and Woodford, Queensland.

History 
The festival was jointly created and promoted by the Village Sounds Agency and Secret Service music companies, and began in 2001 as a one-day gathering to cater for Australia's winter season (a period that had traditionally been associated with very few events of this nature).

The festival has several owners including 51% majority holder NYSE listed Live Nation. 

In April 2020 (approximatley 30 days after the global initial lockdown phase of covid) 5.7% of Live Nation was purchased by the public trust of Saudi Arabia. 

Other owners of the festival include Village Sounds and Secret Sounds (also co owned by Live Nation) 

"Ode: Intimations of Immortality", by English poet William Wordsworth, was the inspiration for the naming of the event. The festival evolved into a two-day event in 2002 and a three-day event in 2009. It is now considered Australia's largest music festival.

Splendour in the Grass showcases popular and established musical artists, as well as emerging Australian artists. The music festival has attracted notable artists such as Coldplay, Powderfinger, Arctic Monkeys, Kanye West, Tame Impala and Lorde. The 2020 festival was to be headlined by Flume, The Strokes, and Tyler, the Creator, but was postponed and then cancelled due to the COVID-19 pandemic. The 2021 edition was to be held in July before being postponed to November then cancelled due to the pandemic, with The Strokes, and Tyler, the Creator, back as headliners, and adding Gorillaz. The 2022 edition will be held in July, with Gorillaz, The Strokes, and Tyler, the Creator returning as headliners.

On 24 and 25 July 2021, Splendour held a virtual festival which AUD$1.5 Million was funded by the federal government RISE program and hosted on US owned platform Sansar called Splendour XR which featured performances from Khalid, The Killers, Charli XCX, CHVRCHES, Denzel Curry, Vance Joy, Tash Sultana and Masked Wolf.

Awards and nominations

National Live Music Awards
The National Live Music Awards (NLMAs) are a broad recognition of Australia's diverse live industry, celebrating the success of the Australian live scene. The awards commenced in 2016.

|-
| National Live Music Awards of 2016
| Splendour in the Grass
| Best Live Music Festival or Event
| 
|-
| National Live Music Awards of 2017
| Splendour in the Grass
| Best Live Music Festival or Event
| 
|-
| National Live Music Awards of 2018
| Splendour in the Grass
| NSW Live Event of the Year
|

Festival summary by year

Lineups

Controversies

Ticketing Issues
Tickets for the 2005 festival were sold out within 11 hours and, soon after, festival tickets that initially cost A$125 were offered on eBay at inflated prices of up to A$3000. The festival organisers responded by sending "cease and desist" letters to eBay, as well as around 150 ticket resellers, citing a breach of the conditions of sale. However, eBay refused to block the ticket auctions, claiming it was the seller's responsibility to ensure that they have the ability and right to sell products. The Triple J radio station encouraged its listeners to sabotage the bidding process and fake bids of up to A$10,000 were consequently listed on eBay by protesters opposed to ticket scalping. Following media coverage, the NSW Department of Fair Trading became involved and met with eBay representatives. The then-Fair Trading Minister John Hatzistergos instructed the Office of Fair Trading to investigate the reselling of tickets and determine whether resellers were in breach of the Fair Trading Act. Festival promoters hoped that the investigation would eventually lead to the introduction of anti-ticket scalping legislation.

In response to the events of 2005, the organisers altered the ticketing system for the 2006 festival. In an unprecedented action, ticket buyers were required to register their name and date of birth at the time of purchase. These details were then printed on the event tickets and valid identification was required to gain admission into the festival. Tickets to the 2006 festival went on sale at 9am on Monday 15 May 2006—all camping tickets sold out within three hours, and all general admission tickets sold out after 48 hours.

Festival organisers encountered difficulties with the ticketing system provided by the Qjump company in 2008, as consumers were unable to purchase tickets following lengthy delays. Qjump later issued an apology on the festival's Internet forum.

In July 2022, hours before performers were set to go on stage and while artists were conducting soundchecks, festival organisers controversially made the decision to cancel all performances scheduled for the first day on the main stage due to poor weather and flooding. Ticketholders took to social media angry after the festival organisers had stated that the "show will go on rain, hail or shine" earlier in the day, prior to the cancellation.

Venue issues 
For a once-only trial, the organisers obtained permission to stage the 2009 Splendour in the Grass at a site in Yelgun. However, the consent provided to the organisers was the subject of a challenge by a group of residents, environmentalist and the Environmental Defenders Office of NSW, who presented their case in the Land and Environment Court of New South Wales. The Chief Judge of the Land and Environment Court, Justice Brian Preston, ruled that Byron Shire Council had exceeded its powers by granting the development consent where the land included parts zoned for conservation purposes. The development consent was ruled invalid, prohibiting the festival from being held at the Yelgun site. As a consequence of the decision, the festival remained at the Belongil site in 2009, before returning one more time in 2012.

In 2016 attendees made accusations they were forced to walk from the venue or sleep in the mud due to a lack of transport.

See also 
 List of Splendour in the Grass line-ups
 Splendour in the Grass 2019

References

External links
Official Website
Rip It Up Magazine | Splendour In The Grass Review

Rock festivals in Australia
Concert tours
Summer festivals
Festivals in Queensland
2001 establishments in Australia
Byron Bay, New South Wales
Music festivals established in 2001
Festivals in New South Wales